The 2002 Georgetown Hoyas football team was an American football team that represented Georgetown University during the 2002 NCAA Division I-AA football season. Georgetown finished sixth in the Patriot League.

In their tenth year under head coach Bob Benson, the Hoyas compiled a 5–6 record. Matt Fronczke, Ed Kuczma and Adam Rini were the team captains.

The Hoyas were outscored 345 to 190. Their 2–5 conference record placed sixth out of eight in the Patriot League standings. 

After 23 years playing home games at Kehoe Field II, problems with the roof of Yates Field House prompted the Hoyas to find a new home for varsity football on their Washington, D.C., campus. Starting in 2002, Georgetown's football team moved into shared quarters with varsity soccer at Harbin Field.

Schedule

References

Georgetown
Georgetown Hoyas football seasons
Georgetown Hoyas football